Tanintharyi Nature Reserve is a strict nature reserve in Myanmar's Tenasserim Hills, covering . Most of the tropical rain forest is evergreen, interspersed with some grassland. The reserve provides habitat to Asian elephant (Elephas maximus) and Gurney's pitta (Hydrornis gurneyi). It was gazetted in 2005 for the maintenance of natural resources, scientific research and education of local people in surrounding communities.

Wildlife recorded during a camera trap survey in 2002 included binturong (Arctictis binturong), large Indian civet (Viverra zibetha), large-spotted civet (Viverra megaspila), Asian palm civet (Paradoxurus hermaphroditus), banded linsang (Prionodon linsang), yellow-throated marten (Martes flavigula) and leopard (Panthera pardus).

References

External links 

Protected areas of Myanmar
Protected areas established in 2005
Tenasserim Hills
Important Bird Areas of Myanmar